Vicki Rubian Sara  (born 17 September 1946) is an Australian endocrinologist, who specialises in research into growth hormones and foetal brain development.

Sara was born in Sydney, and attended Sydney Girls High School. She attended the University of Sydney, graduating with a Bachelor of Arts with Honours and a PhD in 1974 for her thesis titled "The action of prenatal trophic hormones on brain growth and behaviour". She worked at the Garvan Institute of Medical Research from 1973 to 1976, then as a research fellow at the International Brain Research Organization (IBRO). In 1980, she joined the Karolinska Institute in Stockholm, Sweden where she worked until 1993, when she returned to Australia to head the life sciences faculty at Queensland University of Technology. In 1996, she became Dean of Science at QUT.

Professor Sara’s previous appointments include Chief Executive Officer of the Australian Research Council (ARC) from 2001–2004 and Chair of the Council and a member of the Prime Minister’s Science Engineering and Innovation Council (PMSEIC), and the CSIRO Board from 1997–2001.

Sara was appointed as the first female chair of ARC from 1997 to 2000.

On 15 December 2004, Sara was appointed as Chancellor of University of Technology Sydney, serving in the role until 17 February 2016.

In February 2015, the UTS Vicki Sara Building, also known as the Science Faculty Building, named in her honour was officially opened.

Awards 

Centenary Medal in January 2001.

Officer of the Order of Australia in 2010.

Selected publications

References

1946 births
Living people
Australian endocrinologists
Women endocrinologists
University of Sydney alumni
Academic staff of Queensland University of Technology
Academic staff of the University of Technology Sydney
Officers of the Order of Australia
Fellows of the Australian Academy of Technological Sciences and Engineering
Fellows of the Australian Academy of Science
People educated at Sydney Girls High School